Charles Conrad Kempinska (born October 30, 1938) is a former American football player who played one season with the Los Angeles Chargers. He played college football at the University of Mississippi.

References

1938 births
Living people
American football guards
Ole Miss Rebels football players
Los Angeles Chargers players
Players of American football from Mississippi
Sportspeople from Natchez, Mississippi